= Bapa Museum =

Museum in Chefferie Bapa, Cameroon

Coordinates: 5.2780°N 10.3347°E

The Bapa Museum (French: Musée de Bapa), also known as the Bapa Community Museum, was inaugurated in 2018. It is located in the western region of Cameroon in the hauts-plateaux division in the Bangou community.

The museum is based on the theme "Man, Nature, Believes".

== Description ==
The museum was inaugurated on 3 March 2018 at the first edition of the Pa'a Ngouo'ok festival. The goal of the museum is to preserve and transmit the cultural identity of this Bamilkeke group. The museum also seeks to collaborate with other cultural institutions in Cameroon or internationally, to exchange knowledge, welcome exhibitions and benefit from specialised training.

It is under the guardianship of His Majesty Simeu David II. He is the 11th king of the Bapa kingdom since November 1993. He is a major actor of the cultural initiatives of the western region of Cameroon.

The museum is placed under the guardianship of the Ministry of Arts and Culture of Cameroon ensuring an institutional support.

The Bapa museum benefits from external partnership.

The Pa'a Ngouo'ok festival serves as a promoter of the traditional dances of the village such as " Lali " which unites and assembles all the Bapa people.

The museum participated to the exhibition of the museum of quai Branly-Jacques Chirac in 2022.
